Eylül Cansın (1992 – 5 January 2015) was a 23 year old Turkish trans woman who died by suicide after jumping off the Bosphorus Bridge in Istanbul, Turkey, despite police's attempts to stop her. She died on impact. Shortly before her death, she posted a suicide note video in Turkish on her Facebook.

According to journalist Michelle Demishevich, Cansın had been exploited by a gang and forced to engage in sex work. She was buried at the Feriköy Cemetery in Istanbul. Following her suicide, protests stating that her death was murder by society were held in Turkish cities like Ankara, Istanbul, and Izmir. The protests shed light on Turkish police brutality, gang violence towards trans sex workers, and low employment rates for trans citizens.

Social media was outraged by her suicide and sparked more uproar for international LGBT equality in society. The Turkish Psychological Association (TPD) was concerned that her suicide would spark more suicides in Turkish LGBT youth. They say that it is critical that detailed explanations of the death should be avoided, as it is highly likely to become a role model for adolescents and young adults, who are the most inclined to depression and suicidal actions.

See also 
 List of LGBT-related suicides
 Transgender inequality
 LGBT rights in Turkey

References 

Turkish transgender people
Turkish women
Suicides by jumping in Turkey
1992 births
2015 suicides
LGBT-related suicides